Noyabrina Viktorovna Mordyukova (Russian: Но́нна (Ноябри́на) Ви́кторовна Мордюко́ва; 25 November  1925 – 6 July 2008) was a Soviet and Russian actress and People's Artist of the USSR (1974). She was the star of films like director Denis Yevstigneyev's Mama and Nikita Mikhalkov's 1980s hit Family Relations. The editorial board of the British Who's Who encyclopedia included Nona Mordyukova among the top 20 actresses of the 20th century.

Biography
Nonna (Noyabrina) Viktorovna was born into a large family in the Cossack village of Konstantinovka, Donetsk Region, Ukrainian SSR. Nonna spent her childhood in a settlement where her mother worked as chairwoman of kolkhoz (collective farm).

In 1946, Mordyukova entered the Actors’ Faculty of VGIK and studied there under Boris Bibikov and Olga Pyzhova. After graduating she played on stage of Theatre Studio of Film Actor and was often featured by film directors.

In 1948, Mordyukova was married to actor Vyacheslav Tikhonov and had a son (now deceased) by him. The two were divorced in 1963.

Career
In 1949, she was awarded the Stalin Prize for the role of Ulyana Gromova in The Young Guard movie. It was her debut film role.

Her filmography reveals, however, that while she has had the chance to work with a constellation of the best Soviet directors, it has usually been for one project only. There is no high-profile director with whom she has a continuous working relationship.

After her work for Sergei Gerassimov on The Young Guard, she was cast in the last movie of veteran Vsevolod Pudovkin The Return of Vasili Bortnikov (1952).

Other one-time collaborations with well-known directors have been with Mikhail Shvejtser for Chuzhaya rodnya (1955); Lev Kulidzhanov for Otchij dom (1959); Leonid Gaidai for The Diamond Arm; Andrei Konchalovsky for the Turgenev adaptation Dvoryanskoye gnyezdo (1969); Grigori Chukhrai for Tryasina (1978); Eldar Ryazanov for Railway Station for Two, and Nikolai Gubenko for Zapretnaya zona (1988).

She appeared only once in a film by Nikita Mikhalkov, who structured his village comedy-drama Kinfolk (1981) entirely around the personality of the actress, who had by that time established herself as an epitome of the Russian peasant woman.

The role of Klavdia Vavilova, a robust and boisterous Red Army Commissar who has accidentally become pregnant in Aleksandr Askoldov's Commissar (1967) is Mordyukova's most memorable work. The film, shot in 1966, was shelved and was only released in 1988. By that time Mordyukova was over sixty and had starred in over twenty other films.

The wide critical acclaim and appreciation for what is probably her best performance came too late to have any definitive effect on her profile as an actor. She received FIPRESCI Award, Otto Dibelius Film Award, Special Jury Prize at the Berlin International Film Festival, and Silver Spur Award (Flanders International Film Festival) for The Commissar.

During perestroika, Mordyukova appeared in a number of supporting roles in a range of comedy-dramas. Similarly, she has been a highly visible presence throughout the 1990s, with supporting roles in some of the most-popular Russian features, such as Pavel Lungin's Luna Park (1992) and Vladimir Menshov's Shirli-Myrli (1995).

In 1999 she played the leading role in Мother (1999), directed by Denis Yevstigneyev; a family saga loosely based on a real story, mixing melodrama and comedy elements, and spanning over several decades.

"Russian cinema goers and critics call Mordyukova one of the best actresses of the 20th century."

In over fifty years of cinematic work she has played in dozens of films, where she acted mainly as ordinary Russian women.

In November 2000, Russian President Vladimir Putin has signed a presidential decree awarding the Order of Merit for the Fatherland, third degree, to Mordyukova.

The asteroid 4022 Nonna is named after Nonna Mordyukova.

Filmography

Honours and awards
State awards
 Order of Merit for the Fatherland;
2nd class (25 November 2005) - for outstanding contribution to the development of national culture and cinema, many years of creative activity
3rd class (23 November 2000) - for his great personal contribution to the development of cinematography
4th class (27 November 1995) - for services to the state and many years of fruitful work in the arts and culture 
 Order of Friendship of Peoples (1985)
 Order of the Badge of Honour (1975)
 People's Artist of the USSR (1974)
 People's Artist of the RSFSR (1969)
 Honoured Artist of the RSFSR (1965)

Awards
 Stalin Prize, 1st class (1949) - for his role in the film Uliana Gromova, "Young Guard" '
 State Prize of the RSFSR Vasiliev brothers (1973) - for roles in "Crane", "President", etc.
 Prize of the President of Russia (2001) in art and literature

Public Awards
 National Film Award "Nika" (2004) in the "honour and dignity"
 Premium business circles of Russia, "Idol" (1999) in the nomination "For high service to art"
 Award "Kinotavr" (1996) in the "President's Council Award for creative careers"
 Award "Golden Aries" (1995) in the "Man of cinematic year"
 Recognised as one of the 10 most prominent actresses of the 20th century (1992) - according to the Editorial Board of the British reference book Who's Who

References

External links

Nonna Mordyukova, Legendary Cossack Woman of Soviet Cinema (Biography)
 

1925 births
2008 deaths
People from Kostiantynivka
Russian actresses
Soviet actresses
Russian people of Ukrainian descent
Deaths from diabetes
Recipients of the Order "For Merit to the Fatherland", 2nd class
People's Artists of the USSR
Recipients of the Order of Friendship of Peoples
People's Artists of the RSFSR
Honored Artists of the RSFSR
Stalin Prize winners
Recipients of the Vasilyev Brothers State Prize of the RSFSR
Recipients of the Nika Award
Gerasimov Institute of Cinematography alumni